Vaucluse is an eastern suburb of Sydney, in the state of New South Wales, Australia.

Vaucluse is located on the South Head peninsula, just South of The Gap with Sydney Harbour on the west and the Tasman Sea to the east. The Sydney Harbour side of the suburb commands views across the harbour to the Sydney Harbour Bridge. The adjacent suburbs are Watsons Bay to the north and Rose Bay and Dover Heights to the south.

Vaucluse is a mainly residential suburb. For many years it was the most affluent suburb in Sydney and as of May 2017, in terms of houses and properties, was in the top five most expensive suburbs. Tahiti, a Hawaiian-style residence in tropical gardens above Hermit Bay, set an Australian residential record when it sold to a trio of South Africans (the Krok brothers) for more than A$29 million in September 2007. The Australian residential record was overtaken by Leon Kamenev, the founder of Menulog, purchasing four waterfront properties on prestigious Coolong Road for a combined A$80 million in April 2016.

The vast majority of extensively high-worth properties in Vaucluse are located on the western side of New South Head Road towards the harbour, with less expensive housing and property being found closer east of New South Head Road, around South Head General Cemetery.

History

Before European settlement, the area where Vaucluse is now located was inhabited by the Birrabirragal aboriginal clan, who belonged to the coastal Dharug language group. The first European activity in the area took place not long after settlement, when a makeshift signalling station was set up on the ridge overlooking the ocean. Its role was to signal the colony if a ship was approaching. Pilots based at Camp Cove, Watsons Bay, could then meet the ship and guide it through the harbour. A formal signal station was established in 1790, serviced by a bridle trail that later became Old South Head Road in 1811.

Macquarie Lighthouse was constructed on the ridge, a little south of the signal station, in 1816, having been designed by Francis Greenway, the first notable architect in the colony. Residential use of the area also developed.

The original Vaucluse House, from which the area derived its name, was built by Sir Henry Browne Hayes, who had been transported to New South Wales for kidnapping the granddaughter of a wealthy Irish banker. When he arrived, in 1802, he was allowed to buy land from that which was granted to Thomas Laycock in 1793 and Robert Cardell in 1795. The house was then acquired by Captain John Piper in 1822. Sir Henry Browne Hayes, an avid admirer of the 14th-century poet Petrarch, named the house after Petrarch's poem about the famous Fontaine de Vaucluse near the town L'Isle-sur-la-Sorgue, currently in the Department of Vaucluse in southern France. In 1827, the small but charming cottage was bought by William Charles Wentworth (1790–1872), barrister and explorer and one of the men who had crossed the Blue Mountains in 1813. Many structural changes and additions were made while he lived there until 1853. It still survives and is listed on the (now defunct) Register of the National Estate.

In the early 1840s, the present signal station was built by the Colonial Architect, Mortimer Lewis. It has continued to be used up to the present day for controlling shipping in and out of the harbour. Later in the same decade, more residential development occurred with the construction of Greycliffe House at Shark Beach by a son-in-law of William Charles Wentworth. It was a large, sandstone house in the "Victorian Rustic Gothic" style, attributed to the architect John Hilly. A succession of prominent Sydney identities leased the house during the 19th century. It was gutted by fire in the 1890s but fully restored. It is now used as the visitor centre for the Sydney Harbour National Park.

Another substantial residential development was the construction, in 1854–56, of Carrara on the harbour foreshores. Carrara was designed by John Hilly for John Hosking, the first Lord Mayor of Sydney. The house featured verandahs with Doric columns and was situated to take advantage of the harbour views. Its name was changed to Strickland House in 1915, when it was turned into a convalescent home for women.

By 1871, the colony was experiencing the "Russian scare" that prevailed at the time, as a result of which fortifications were built at Steel Point, just a little north-west of Carrara. Cannon emplacements, powder magazine and embrasures, plus a store and barrack rooms, were constructed at this strategic point overlooking the harbour. The buildings were made of sandstone found at the site and still survive today; they are listed on the Register of the National Estate.

  

Not long afterwards, Mortimer Lewis was designing a tomb for the Wentworth family. William Charles Wentworth died in England in 1872 and his remains were interred in the Victorian Gothic mausoleum that was constructed in Chapel Road, Vaucluse. Made of sandstone, the building featured a stained glass window in the west end and a clerestory window above the door.

Around about the same time, Edward Mason Hunt was busy designing a Victorian Gothic mansion south of Carrara. This two-storey sandstone home incorporated a much smaller home built at that site by Alexander Dick, circa 1840; that home changed hands in 1868 and enlargement proceeded. The new mansion, known as The Hermitage, featured multiple gables, a castellated tower and prominent fretwork. It was damaged by fire in 1936 but was restored by Emil Sodersten. It was bought in 1964 by the Woolworths company, which used it for some time as a training facility.

Just a little East of The Hermitage, St Michael's Church of England went up in 1877, after being designed by Edmund Blacket. Located in St Michael's Place, this new sandstone church would later be enlarged in the 1930s, with the addition of a new spire, by Professor Leslie Wilkinson. The new design would eventually win the Sulman Prize for architecture in 1942. In 1928, the largest property purchase in the history of Vaucluse was completed by Bariston and Decima Ashton joining 8 adjoining blocks into one large single block of 2.25 acres. This record was surpassed in 2011 with the Department of Foreign Affairs purchase of 3 acres in lower Vaucluse.

By the 1880s, Greenway's Macquarie Lighthouse was in bad repair. In 1883, the Colonial Architect of the day, James Barnet, built a new lighthouse which was virtually a perfect replica of the original one, and the original was demolished. Other buildings making up the group were the assistant lighthouse keepers' cottages, built circa 1881, and Greenway's keeper's cottage, dating from circa 1840. There are also remains of courtyards to earlier cottages and the stone base wall of the original lighthouse. The entire group is listed on the Register of the National Estate.

Former military sites

Several defensive fortifications are located on the shores and cliff tops of Vaucluse, such as the Signal Hill Battery, constructed in 1892; it was intended to defend the town of Sydney from bombardment by an enemy vessel standing off the coast. Although the fortification has been heavily vandalised, it is still intact and lies adjacent to the Signal Hill, signal station.

The Steel Point fortification in Nielsen Park was constructed in 1871; it originally accommodated three 80-pounder rifled muzzle-loaders (RMLs) that were replaced in the 1890s with 5 inch breech-loading guns. The fortification was built at a time when fears of a Russian attack seemed imminent, as well as other concerns such as withdrawal of British garrison troops, threats to British dependencies and increasing self-reliance in defence matters. The battery consisted of three sandstone gun emplacements with embrasures for the guns to fire through. The gun emplacements were connected to underground chambers, as well as a gunpowder magazine, by open passages and underground passageways leading into the complex.

In the 1950s, the RAN degaussing station was constructed over part of the Steel Point fortification. The degaussing station was a countermeasure against magnetic mines. Shark Island was used for this purpose during World War II. Naval ships would pass over cables laid under the harbour and were effectively demagnetized.

Heritage listings 
Vaucluse has a number of heritage-listed sites, including:
 793 Old South Head Road: South Head General Cemetery
 32b Fitzwilliam Road: Wentworth Memorial Church
 Chapel Road: Wentworth Mausoleum
 Greycliffe Avenue: Nielsen Park
 Old South Head Road: Macquarie Lighthouse
 52 Vaucluse Road: Strickland House, Vaucluse
 69a Wentworth Road: Vaucluse House

Population
At the 2021 census, 9,510 people were recorded in Vaucluse.

In the 2016 census, there were 9,337 people in Vaucluse.  57.5% of people were born in Australia. The next most common countries of birth were South Africa 7.8%, England 5.2%, China 2.3%, New Zealand 1.9% and Israel 1.4%. 74.4% of people only spoke English at home. Other languages spoken at home included Mandarin 2.3%, Greek 2.2%, Russian 1.8%, Hebrew 1.8% and Italian 1.3%. The most common responses for religion were Judaism 23.2%, No Religion 22.6%, Catholic 19.8% and Anglican 11.5%.

Landmarks
 

The Macquarie Lighthouse sits prominently on the eastern side of the suburb, at Dunbar Head. Vaucluse House is an historic home managed by the Historic Houses Trust. It is situated in Wentworth Road, with views across Sydney Harbour.

South Head Cemetery

South Head General Cemetery is situated at the junction of New South Head Road and Old South Head Road in Vaucluse.

The cemetery was established in 1868 to cater for the needs of the population in the growing Vaucluse area. It was run for some time by a private trust, but management was transferred to Waverley Council in 1941. There are a number of well-known people interred at the cemetery including Australia's first Prime Minister, Sir Edmund Barton.

Architect John Horbury Hunt's last commission was a memorial to Sir John Robertson, former Premier of New South Wales. The memorial is shaped like a cone with two sections, the bottom of which commemorates Robertson's wife, while the top half commemorates Robertson himself. Also interred in this cemetery are members of the Fairfax, Norton, Packer, and Street families; and NSW Governors Sir Walter Edward Davidson and Sir Roden Cutler. The cemetery also contains the graves of 22 of the forty victims of the 1927 Greycliffe ferry disaster.

Notable residents
Henry Browne Hayes (1762–1832), Irish-born convict transported to New South Wales, owner of Vaucluse House
William Charles Wentworth (1790-1872), pastoralist, explorer, newspaper editor, lawyer, politician and owner of Vaucluse House
Edwin Sautelle (1872–1946), town clerk and mayor of Vaucluse
Ted Greatorex (1901–1964), rugby union player
Janette Howard (born 1944), wife of Prime Minister John Howard
Henry George Nicholls (c. 1852–1936), minister
Ezra Norton (1897–1967), newspaper baron and businessman
Natalie Portman (born 1981), actor
Stuart Robinson (born 1959), former Bishop of Canberra-Goulburn
Rod Sims (born 1950), chair of the Australian Competition & Consumer Commission (ACCC)
Steven Solomon (born 1993), Olympic sprinter
 David Horwitz (born 1994)former Rugby Union player. Flyhalf/Centre for Australian schoolboys, Australian Under 20s, NSW Waratahs and Connacht Rugby. First player of Jewish faith to play Super Rugby.

Gallery

References

Citations

Sources 

 The Book of Sydney Suburbs, Compiled by Frances Pollon, Angus & Robertson Publishers, 1990, Published in Australia , page 259.

External links 

 Google Maps: Vaucluse
 Historic Houses Trust Vaucluse House

 
Suburbs of Sydney
Waverley Council
New South Head Road, Sydney
Municipality of Woollahra